Deudorix epijarbas, the cornelian or hairy line blue, is a species of lycaenid or blue butterfly found in south and southeast Asia from India to Fiji, including the Philippines, and also the tropical coast of Queensland in Australia. The species was first described by Frederic Moore in 1857.

Description

The wingspan is about 30 mm.

The larvae feed on Sapindus trifoliatus, Euphoria longan, Litchi chinensis, Aesculus indicus, Connarus species (in seed capsules), Harpullia pendula, Pometia pinnata, Caryota rumphiana and Sarcopteryx martyana.

Subspecies
The subspecies are:
D. e. epijarbas (south India, Sri Lanka)
D. e. ancus Fruhstorfer, 1912 (northern India)
D. e. amatius Fruhstorfer, 1912 (Assam to northern Thailand, Indo China)
D. e. cinnabarus Fruhstorfer, 1912 (southern Thailand to Sundaland)
D. e. terenzius Fruhstorfer (Nias)
D. e. enganicus Fruhstorfer (Enggano)
D. e. mesarchus Fruhstorfer, 1912 (Lesser Sunda Islands)
D. e. corolianus Fruhstorfer, 1912 (Palawan, Philippines)
D. e. megakles Fruhstorfer, 1912 (Sulawesi)
D. e. menesicles Fruhstorfer, 1912 (Taiwan)
D. e. dido Waterhouse, 1934 (Kuranda, Cairns)
D. e. biaka Joicey & Talbot (Biak)
D. e. turbo Fruhstorfer (Moluccas, Waigeu, Misool, Kai, West Irian to Papua, Manam, Tagula)
D. e. diovella Waterhouse, 1920 (Fiji)

See also
List of butterflies of India (Lycaenidae)

References

External links

 With images.

Deudorigini
Insect pests of tropical forests
Butterflies of Asia
Butterflies of Singapore
Deudorix